"All the Love", also known as "All the Love in the World", is a song by English rock band the Outfield. It was the third single from their debut studio album, Play Deep (1985), released on Columbia Records. The single followed the band's biggest hit, "Your Love", and was released in May 1986. In the U.S., the song hit number 14 on the Billboard Album Rock Tracks chart and number 19 on the Billboard Hot 100.

Charts

References

External links

1985 songs
1986 singles
The Outfield songs
Columbia Records singles
Songs written by John Spinks (musician)